Diogenio Bigaglia (c.1678c.1745) was a Venetian monk, and a well-known composer and virtuoso of his time.

Life 

Diogenio Bigaglia was born on the island of Murano, just north of Venice. He entered the Benedictine monastery of San Giorgio Maggiore in Venice in 1694. In 1700 he was ordained a priest, and in 1713 became the prior of the monastery.

Works 

Bigaglia composed both sacred and secular vocal works. Of his larger sacred compositions little has survived. His instrumental music includes several polyphonic concerti and solo concertos, notably his 12 sonatas for violin or recorder (flauto) and Basso continuo Op. 1 (published by  Le Cène, Amsterdam, 1715).

References 
  

18th-century Italian composers
Italian male classical composers